The Yosemite Mountain Sugar Pine Railroad (YMSPRR) is a historic  narrow gauge railroad with two operating steam train locomotives located near Fish Camp, California, in the Sierra National Forest near the southern entrance to Yosemite National Park. Rudy Stauffer organized the YMSPRR in 1961, utilizing historic railroad track, rolling stock and locomotives to construct a tourist line along the historic route of the Madera Sugar Pine Lumber Company.

Service began with the purchase of three-truck Shay locomotive No. 10 from the West Side Lumber Company railway of Tuolumne, California.  Built in 1928, No. 10 was recognized as the largest narrow gauge Shay locomotive—and one of the last constructed.  After his retirement in 1981, Rudy Stauffer was succeeded by his son, Max, as the railroad's owner and operator.  In 1986, the YMSPRR purchased Shay No. 15—also a former West Side Lumber Company locomotive—from the West Side & Cherry Valley Railroad tourist line in Tuolumne.

The two steam locomotives operate daily during the summer months, while the railroad's Model A "Jenny" railcars, capable of carrying about a dozen passengers, typically handle operations during the off-season. Passengers can ride in either open-air or enclosed passenger cars.

History

The current railroad follows a portion of grade originally carved into the mountain by the Madera Sugar Pine Lumber Company in the early 20th century. The company originated in 1874, when it was organized as the California Lumber Company to log the area surrounding Oakhurst, California. The Madera Sugar Pine Lumber Company once had a large sawmill at Sugar Pine, California, just south of the current YMSPRR. In addition to the railroad, the Company also transported lumber in a flume that stretched  from Sugar Pine to Madera, California. This was the most efficient way to transport rough cut lumber out of the mountains for finishing and transport at the bottom of the mountain. The Madera Sugar Pine Lumber Company practiced clearcutting, which removed almost every single tree within the stands of timber surrounding the YMSPRR track. The thick forest surrounding YMSPRR today belies this history, although large stumps from the original old growth timber dot the forest floor lining the tracks.

Due to the onset of the Great Depression and a lack of trees, the operation closed in 1931.  But the graded right-of-way through the forest remained, enabling the Stauffer family to reconstruct a portion of the line in 1961.  The current railroad utilizes locomotives, converted log disconnect cars, and other railroad equipment purchased from the West Side Lumber Company after it ceased railroad operations in 1961.

Max Stauffer died on March 10, 2017. In late August 2017, the Railroad Fire, which started near the railroad, destroyed West Side Lumber Company equipment stored on a side track.

Motive Power

No. 10: a  narrow gauge three-truck Shay steam locomotive constructed for the Pickering Lumber Company. The locomotive was completed on March 2, 1928, by the Lima Locomotive Works of Lima, Ohio, and later acquired by the West Side Lumber Company in 1934. This locomotive is reputedly the largest narrow gauge Shay locomotive ever constructed.

No. 15: also a  narrow gauge three-truck Shay steam locomotive. No. 15 was originally constructed as the No. 9 for Norman P. Livermore & Company, out of San Francisco, California, and soon thereafter sold to the Sierra Nevada Wood & Lumber Co.  The locomotive was completed on May 20, 1913, by the Lima Locomotive Works of Lima, Ohio. In 1917, the No. 15 was acquired by Hobart Estate Co. as their No. 9. In 1938, the No. 15 was given its current number when purchased by the Hyman-Michaels Co., operating out of San Francisco. The West Side Lumber Company purchased No. 15 only a year later. When the West Side shut down in the 1960s, a tourist operation, the West Side & Cherry Valley, acquired the No. 15. After hauling tourists for a number of years, the locomotive sat on static display in Tuolumne, California, until the YMSPRR acquired it in 1988.
"Jenny" Railcars: Ford Model A automobiles converted for rail use by the West Side Lumber Company.  These railcars each accommodate about 12 people, providing regular service in conjunction with the normal steam operation.
No. 402: a  narrow gauge center cab two-truck diesel locomotive.  The YMSPRR does not use this locomotive for regularly scheduled revenue service.
No. 5: a  narrow gauge two axle diesel switch engine built in 1935, but not currently in operating condition.

Points of interest
The Thornberry Museum, a historic log cabin built over 140-years ago, offering visitors a glance at what life was like on the slopes of the Sierras over a century ago
The Sugar Pine Trading Company, providing a selection of literature and sources related to the YMSPRR, railroads and the history of Yosemite Valley
Picnic and event grounds at the eastern terminus of the line
Gold panning
A rare narrow gauge snowplow, the West Side Lumber Company's plow No. 2

See also

List of heritage railroads in the United States
Yosemite National Park

References

External links
Yosemite Mountain Sugar Pine Railroad Website
Picture album of the railroad
The Narrow Gauge Inn, adjacent to the railroad property
30-min video: Huell Howser rides the railroad on a 2007 episode of California's Gold.

Heritage railroads in California
Railroad museums in California
3 ft gauge railways in the United States
Narrow gauge railroads in California
Companies based in Madera County, California
Sierra National Forest
Sierra Nevada (United States)
Yosemite National Park
Tourist attractions in Mariposa County, California
Transportation in Mariposa County, California
Museums in Mariposa County, California